Rofleponide is a synthetic glucocorticoid corticosteroid which was never marketed.

References

Corticosteroid cyclic ketals
Cyclic acetals with aldehydes
Diketones
Diols
Fluoroarenes
Glucocorticoids
Pregnanes
Abandoned drugs